Belmont Park is a neighbourhood of the District of Colwood, part of the Western Communities area of Greater Victoria, British Columbia, Canada.  It is located on Department of National Defence property.

References

Greater Victoria
Populated places in the Capital Regional District